
The year 510 BC was a year of the pre-Julian Roman calendar. In the Roman Empire, it was known as year 244  Ab urbe condita. The denomination 510 BC for this year has been used since the early medieval period, when the Anno Domini calendar era became the prevalent method in Europe for naming years.

Events

By place

Europe 
 Hippias, tyrant of Athens, is expelled  by his people with the assistance of Cleomenes, King of Sparta
 The reign of Lucius Tarquinius Superbus, last king of the traditional seven Kings of Rome, concludes. The Kingdom of Rome falls and is replaced by the Roman Republic. (or 509 BC)
 Ariston is succeeded as King of Sparta by Demaratus.
 Stelae begin to be banned in Athenian cemeteries (approximate date; ends c. 430 BC).
 Scylax of Caryanda becomes the first mariner to have passed the Indian Ocean.

Births 
 Cimon, Athenian statesman and strategos (d. 450 BC)

Deaths 
 Aryandes, Persian satrap of Egypt (executed by the Persian king Darius I)
 Annei, emperor of Japan (b. 577 BC)

References